Fritz Pregl Prize has been awarded annually since 1931, to an Austrian scientist for distinguished achievements in chemistry by the Austrian Academy of Sciences (Österreichische Akademie der Wissenschaften) from the funds left at its disposal by the Nobel prize-winning chemist Fritz Pregl.

Not currently awarded.

Recipients

See also
 List of chemistry awards
 Prizes named after people

References

External links
 Austrian Academy of Sciences site

Chemistry awards
Austrian science and technology awards
Awards established in 1931